Spilarctia motuonica is a moth in the family Erebidae. It was described by Cheng-Lai Fang in 1982. It is found in China (Tibet).

References

Moths described in 1982
motuonica